

Season Review

Transfers

In:

Out:

Squad

Coaching staff
{|class="wikitable"
|-
!Position
!Staff
|-
|Manager|| Marjan Sekulovski
|-
|rowspan="4"|Assistant Manager|| Myo Min Tun
|-
| U Than Wai
|-
| U Tin Maung Tun
|-
|
|-
|Goalkeeper Coach|| U Win Naing
|-
|Fitness Coach|| U Zaw Naing
|-

Other information

|-

References

Yangon United